Aegomorphus is a large genus of beetles in the family Cerambycidae.

Taxonomy
Most of the species presently in Aegomorphus were originally placed in the genus Acanthoderes, or (more recently) under the invalid name Psapharochrus, which was a subgenus of Acanthoderes for much of its history, and later elevated to genus rank before it was determined (in 2020) to be a junior synonym of Aegomorphus.

Species

 Aegomorphus albosignus Chemsak & Noguera, 1993
 Aegomorphus antonkozlovi Santos-Silva, Nascimento & Silva Junior, 2020
 Aegomorphus arietis (Bates, 1885)
 Aegomorphus arizonicus Linsley & Chemsak, 1984
 Aegomorphus atrosignatus (Melzer, 1932)
 Aegomorphus bezarki (Santos-Silva & Galileo, 2016)
 Aegomorphus bicuspis (Germar, 1823)
 Aegomorphus bimaculatus (Fuchs, 1958)
 Aegomorphus binocularis (Martins, 1981)
 Aegomorphus bivitta (White, 1855)
 Aegomorphus borrei (Dugés, 1885)
 Aegomorphus brevicornis (Zajciw, 1964)
 Aegomorphus brunnescens (Zajciw, 1963)
 Aegomorphus carinicollis (Bates, 1880)
 Aegomorphus cerdai (Tavakilian & Neouze, 2013)
 Aegomorphus chamelae Chemsak & Giesbert, 1986
 Aegomorphus chrysopus (Bates, 1861)
 Aegomorphus circumflexus (Jacquelin du Val in Sagra, 1857)
 Aegomorphus clavipes (Schrank, 1781)
 Aegomorphus clericus (Bates, 1880)
 Aegomorphus comptus (Marinoni & Martins, 1978)
 Aegomorphus conifera (Zajciw, 1963)
 Aegomorphus consentaneus (Thomson, 1865)
 Aegomorphus contaminatus (Thomson, 1865)
 Aegomorphus corticarius (Tippmann, 1960)
 Aegomorphus crocostigma (Bates, 1880)
 Aegomorphus cylindricus (Bates, 1861)
 Aegomorphus doctus (Bates, 1880)
 Aegomorphus excellens (Zajciw, 1964)
 Aegomorphus flavitarsis (Fuchs, 1962)
 Aegomorphus francottei Sama 1994
 Aegomorphus galapagoensis (Linell, 1899)
 Aegomorphus geminus Galileo & Martins, 2012
 Aegomorphus gigas Galileo & Martins, 2012
 Aegomorphus grisescens (Pic, 1897)
 Aegomorphus hebes (Bates, 1861)
 Aegomorphus homonymus (Blackwelder, 1946)
 Aegomorphus inquinatus (Bates, 1872)
 Aegomorphus irumus Galileo & Martins, 2011
 Aegomorphus itatiayensis (Melzer, 1935)
 Aegomorphus jaspideus (Germar, 1824)
 Aegomorphus juno (Fisher, 1938)
 Aegomorphus krueperi (Kraatz, 1859)
 Aegomorphus laetificus (Bates, 1880)
 Aegomorphus lanei (Marinoni & Martins, 1978)
 Aegomorphus langeri (Martins, Santos-Silva & Galileo, 2015)
 Aegomorphus lateralis (Bates, 1861)
 Aegomorphus leucodryas (Bates, 1880)
 Aegomorphus longipennis (Zajciw, 1963)
 Aegomorphus longispinis (Bates, 1861)
 Aegomorphus longitarsis (Bates, 1880)
 Aegomorphus lotor (White, 1855)
 Aegomorphus luctuosus (Bates, 1880)
 Aegomorphus maccartyi (Chemsak & Hovore, 2002)
 Aegomorphus maculatissimus (Bates, 1861)
 Aegomorphus magnus (Marinoni & Martins, 1978)
 Aegomorphus meleagris (Bates, 1861)
 Aegomorphus mexicanus Martins, Santos-Silva & Galileo 2015
 Aegomorphus modestus (Gyllenhal in Schoenherr, 1817)
 Aegomorphus morrisi (Uhler, 1855)
 Aegomorphus mourei (Zajciw, 1964)
 Aegomorphus nearnsi Martins & Galileo, 2010
 Aegomorphus nigricans (Lameere, 1884)
 Aegomorphus nigromaculatus (Fuchs, 1962)
 Aegomorphus nigropunctatus (Tippmann, 1960)
 Aegomorphus nigrovittatus (Zajciw, 1969)
 Aegomorphus obscurior (Pic, 1904)
 Aegomorphus pantherinus (Tavakilian & Neouze, 2013)
 Aegomorphus peninsularis (Horn, 1880)
 Aegomorphus penrosei (Chemsak & Hovore, 2002)
 Aegomorphus pereirai (Prosen & Lane, 1955)
 Aegomorphus peritapnioides (Linsley, 1958)
 Aegomorphus phasianus (Bates, 1861)
 Aegomorphus pictus Galileo & Martins, 2012
 Aegomorphus pigmentatus (Bates, 1861)
 Aegomorphus pinima Galileo & Martins, 2006
 Aegomorphus piperatus (Gahan, 1892)
 Aegomorphus piraiuba Martins & Galileo, 2004
 Aegomorphus polystictus (Bates, 1885)
 Aegomorphus pseudosatellinus (Tavakilian & Neouze, 2013)
 Aegomorphus purulensis (Bates, 1885)
 Aegomorphus quadrigibbus (Say, 1831)
 Aegomorphus ramirezi (Chemsak & Hovore, 2002)
 Aegomorphus ridleyi (Waterhouse, 1894)
 Aegomorphus rileyi (Tavakilian & Neouze, 2013)
 Aegomorphus robustus Santos-Silva, Botero & Wappes, 2020
 Aegomorphus rufitarsis (Kirsch, 1889)
 Aegomorphus satellinus (Erichson, 1847)
 Aegomorphus schmithi (Melzer, 1935)
 Aegomorphus signatifrons (Zajciw, 1964)
 Aegomorphus signatus (Gahan, 1892)
 Aegomorphus socorroensis (Linsley, 1942)
 Aegomorphus travassosi (Monné & Magno, 1992)
 Aegomorphus umbratus (Bates, 1885)
 Aegomorphus vetustus (Bates, 1880)
 Aegomorphus wappesi (Galileo, Martins & Santos-Silva, 2015)

References

Aegomorphus
Acanthoderini